Eich is a Verbandsgemeinde ("collective municipality") in the district Alzey-Worms, Rhineland-Palatinate, Germany. The seat of the Verbandsgemeinde is in Eich.

The Verbandsgemeinde Eich consists of the following Ortsgemeinden ("local municipalities"):

 Alsheim
 Eich
 Gimbsheim
 Hamm am Rhein
 Mettenheim

It is mentioned in the Wormser wall-building ordinance from around 900 as one of the places that shared responsibility for maintaining the city wall of Worms.

References

Verbandsgemeinde in Rhineland-Palatinate